Delta Debugging is a methodology to automate the debugging of programs using a scientific approach of hypothesis-trial-result loop. This methodology was first developed by Andreas Zeller of the Saarland University in 1999.

In practice, the Delta Debugging algorithm builds on unit testing to isolate failure causes automatically - by systematically narrowing down failure-inducing circumstances until a minimal set remains. For example, if you can supply a test case that will produce the bug you are looking for, then you can feed that to the Delta Debugging algorithm, which will then simply try to trim useless functions and lines of code that are not needed to reproduce the bug, until a 1-minimal program is found.

Delta Debugging has been applied to isolate failure-inducing program input (e.g. an HTML page that makes a Web browser fail), failure-inducing user interaction (e.g. the keystrokes that make a program crash), or failure-inducing changes to the program code (e.g. after a failing regression test).

Later, some software development tools have been inspired by Delta Debugging, such as the bisect commands of revision control systems (e.g., git-bisect, svn-bisect, hg-bisect, etc.), which, instead of working on the program's code, apply the delta debugging methodology on the code history by comparing various versions until the faulty change is found.

Recently, Network Dialog Minimization a technique based on delta debugging is proposed to find the smallest subset of network traffic from the original dialog, that when replayed still achieves the same goal as the original dialog

Software 
 delta - a computer program to minimize "interesting" files subject to a test of their interestingness 
 DD.py - a Python implementation of Delta Debugging; also see its tutorial
 Lithium - a Python implementation of an enhanced Delta Debugging algorithm
 C-Reduce, which reduces source files written in C/C++, uses the Delta algorithms
 Perses - a language-agnostic reducer for program minimization, which employs Delta debugging algorithm.
 DustMite - A general-purpose data reduction tool, mainly used to reduce D programs.
 Eclipse Plug-Ins
 DDinput - Failure-Inducing Input
 DDchange - Failure-Inducing Changes
 DDstate - Failure-Inducing States
 XMLmate
 Common Lisp implementation
 Igor - command line tool

See also

 Bisection (software engineering)
 Program slicing

References
 Andreas Zeller: Why Programs Fail: A Guide to Systematic Debugging, Morgan Kaufmann, 
 Learning from Code History A presentation at Google Tech Talk from the original inventor of the Delta Debugging

External links
Delta Debugging project - extensive collection of links to delta debugging tools and methods
Udacity course on Software Debugging by Andreas Zeller

Debugging